Blepharomastix achroalis is a moth in the family Crambidae. It is found in Jamaica, Cuba, and Florida.

The wingspan is 16–18 mm. Adults are on wing from January to March, May to August and October to December in Florida.

References

Moths described in 1913
Blepharomastix